Hessel Hermana is the fourth potestaat (or elected governor) of Friesland in the list of rulers of Frisia. Supposedly from Sexbierum (chosen 869 - died c876), he does not appear in historical sources until the late 16th century.

His name is then attached to the Dane Rudolf Haraldsson who invaded Oostergo in order to recover Danegeld (tribute) by force. These Danes were on the way back from France. A battle ensued with this gang of 800 Vikings involving the death of 500 Danes on the battlefield. Rudolf Haraldsson was killed in battle and the Frisians won, but Hessel also lost his life.

His predecessor was Adelbrik Adelen and he was succeeded by Igo Galema as potestaat.

His family crest exhibits 2 Frisian eagles.

References
Friesche Almanak 1892

Potestaats of Friesland
876 deaths
9th-century rulers in Europe
People from Franekeradeel
Year of birth unknown